Ipelce is a department or commune of Bazèga Province in central Burkina Faso. Its capital lies at the town of Ipelce. According to the 1996 census, the department has a total population of 12,802 .

Towns and villages
 IpelceBabdoBandélaBanghingoGuismaKactingaNacombogoNarogtingaSagabtinga-YarcéSambinSandebaSiltougdoZinguedeghin

References

Departments of Burkina Faso
Bazèga Province